The mojarras are a family, Gerreidae, of fish in the order Perciformes. The family includes about 53 species found worldwide in tropical and warm temperate regions. They mostly inhabit coastal salt and brackish waters, although some occur in fresh water.

Mojarras are a common prey and bait fish in many parts of the world, including the South American coast and Caribbean islands as well as the Gulf of Mexico and the Atlantic coast of North America.  These species tend to be difficult to identify in the field and often require microscopic examination.  Most species exhibit a schooling behavior and tend to exploit the shallow water refugia associated with coastal areas presumably to avoid large-bodied predators, such as the lemon shark.

Mojarra is also commonly used in Latin American countries as a name for various species of the cichlid family, including tilapia.

Genera
The seven genera currently assigned to this family are:
 †Aspesiperca Bannikov 2008 (only known from fossil remains)
 †Gerreidarum  (only known from fossilized otolith remains)
 Deckertichthys Vergara-Solana, 2014
 Diapterus Ranzani, 1842
 Eucinostomus Baird & Girard, 1855
 Eugerres Jordan & Evermann, 1927
 Gerres Quoy & Gaimard, 1824
 Parequula Steindachner, 1879  
 Pentaprion Bleeker, 1850
 Ulaema Jordan & Evermann 1895

Timeline

See also
Silver biddy

References 
 

Gerreidae